The Seth Hallett House is a historic house in the Hyannis village of Barnstable, Massachusetts. Built in 1775, this -story Cape house is one of the few surviving Federal style houses on Main Street in Hyannis. In the mid-19th century it was occupied by Seth Hallett, a town selectman. The house was listed on the National Register of Historic Places in 1987.

Description and history
The Hallett House is set at the northeast corner of Main and Camp Streets in the village of Hyannis. It is a -story Cape style house, five bays wide, with a side gable roof, a central chimney (not original), and wood shingle siding. An ell of early construction extends to the rear of the main block, while a modern but sympathetically styled addition extends the house three bays to the left.  The main entrance is centered on the original block, with simple pilasters on either side and a narrow transom window above.

Construction of the house is estimated to have been in about 1775, but nothing is known of its early owners. It was owned by Seth Hallett, a town selectman, in the mid-19th century. It presently houses a medical practice.

See also
National Register of Historic Places listings in Barnstable County, Massachusetts

References

Houses in Barnstable, Massachusetts
National Register of Historic Places in Barnstable, Massachusetts
Houses on the National Register of Historic Places in Barnstable County, Massachusetts
Houses completed in 1775
Federal architecture in Massachusetts